K.C. Bokadia Kistur Chand Bokadia is an Indian filmmaker.  He has produced Pyar Jhukta Nahin, Teri Meherbaniyan, Naseeb Apna Apna, Hum Tumhare Hai Sanam, Pyaar Zindagi Hai and Main Tera Dushman. He has directed Phool Bane Angaaray, Police Aur Mujrim, Insaaniyat Ke Devta, Aaj Ka Arjun, Kudrat Ka Kanoon.He co-produced Paap Ka Ant.

The Deccan Chronicle called him "the fastest producer to make 50 films". He made unconventional films such as 'Teri Meherbaniya' in which the main protagonist was a dog. He has also made films based on animals like Teri Meherbaniyan, Main Tera Dushman, Kundan. As of June 2021, he made 60+ films spanning various Indian languages.

He made his debut as producer with Rivaaj in 1972. His debut as a director was Aaj Ka Arjun (1990) starring Amitabh Bachchan.

After the sudden demise of K Asif, he helped in completing and releasing K Asif's last film "Love and God".

He has worked with actors Rajesh Khanna, Jeetendra, Amitabh Bachchan, Shatrughan Sinha, Saif Ali Khan, Raaj Kumar, Salman Khan, Sunny Deol, Shahrukh Khan, Vinod Khanna, Ajay Devgan, Dharmendra, Akshay Kumar, Mithun Chakraborty, Jackie Shroff, Govinda and Rajnikanth.

Filmography

Producer

 Rivaaj (1972)
 Teri Meherbaniyan (1985)
 Pyar Jhukta Nahin (1985)
 Naseeb Apna Apna (1986)
 Jawab Hum Denge (1987)
 Kudrat Ka Kanoon (1987)
 Kab Tak Chup Rahungi (1988)
 Ganga Tere Desh Mein (1988)
 Main Tera Dushman (1989)
 Aaj Ka Arjun (1990)
 Phool Bane Angaarey (1991)
 Police Aur Mujrim (1992)
 Mere Sajana Saath Nibhana (1992)
 Tahqiqaat (1993)
 Aao Pyaar Karen (1994)
 Janta Ki Adalat (1994)
 Zakhmi Sipahi (1995)
 Muqadama (1996)
 Hitler (1998)
 Lal Baadshah (1999)
 Sultaan (presentation producer) (2000)
 Pyaar Zindagi Hai (2001)
 Hum Tumhare Hain Sanam (2002)
 Khuda Kasam (presentation producer) (2010)

Director

References

External links 
 

Living people
Hindi-language film directors
20th-century Indian film directors
21st-century Indian film directors
20th-century Indian Jains
Year of birth missing (living people)